M.P. Power Generating Company Limited (MPPGCL) is the electricity generation company of the Government of Madhya Pradesh state in India.

Generation capacity 
The installed capacity of MPPGCL as on 01.01.2019 is 6315 MW out of which madhya pradesh share is about 6312.50 MW.

Power stations

Thermal power stations coal based 

Total installed thermal capacity 5400 MW.

Hydel power stations 

Two proposed Hydel unit at Chhindwara(2x45MW) and Murena(270 MW)

References 

Electric-generation companies of India
State electricity agencies of India
State agencies of Madhya Pradesh
Energy in Madhya Pradesh
2001 establishments in Madhya Pradesh
Indian companies established in 2001